Ingle is an unincorporated community located in the towns of Randolph and Scott, Columbia County, Wisconsin, United States. The community was named after James Inglehart, who settled the region in 1842.

Notes

Unincorporated communities in Columbia County, Wisconsin
Unincorporated communities in Wisconsin
Populated places established in 1842
1842 establishments in Wisconsin Territory